NATI was a manufacturer of motorcycles in the Soviet Union from 1931 -1933. It built the NATI-A-750, designed by Soviet engineer Pyotr Mozharov, prior to the transfer of manufacturing to Podolsk Mechanical Plant.

References 
 "Entsiklopediya Mototsiklov. Firmi. Modeli. Konstruktsii.", Za Rulem, Moscow (2003). Энциклопедия Мотоциклов. Фирмы. Модели. Конструкции. - За Рулем - Москва (2003) p. 376-7 

Defunct motorcycle manufacturers of Russia
Manufacturing companies based in Moscow
Motorcycle manufacturers of the Soviet Union
Vehicle manufacturing companies established in 1931
Vehicle manufacturing companies disestablished in 1933
1931 establishments in the Soviet Union